William Thomas Thornhill Webber (30 January 1837 – 3 August 1903) was the third Anglican Bishop of Brisbane in Queensland, Australia.

Early life 
Webber was born in London, the son of a surgeon, William Webber and his wife Eliza (née Preston). He was educated at Tonbridge School, Kent, at Norwich School under John Woolley and Pembroke College, Oxford where he obtained B.A. in 1859 and M.A. in 1862.

Religious life 
Webber was ordained a deacon in 1860 and a priest in 1861.

Webber spent four years as curate of Chiswick (1860–64). He was then Vicar of St John the Evangelist, Holborn, (1864–85) and was a member of the London School Board (1882–85). He was consecrated bishop of Brisbane on 11 June 1885 by Edward White Benson, Archbishop of Canterbury, at St Paul's Cathedral, London and enthroned on 17 November 1885 in St John's Cathedral, Brisbane. He brought clergymen over from Oxford and Cambridge Universities for work in Queensland on five-year tours of duty.

Webber visited England in 1888 to attend the Pan-Anglican synod at Lambeth. He spent a lot of his time in raising funds, including money for a cathedral in Brisbane but died before work commenced. Webber visited England again in 1901, and early in 1902 preached by command before Edward VII at Sandringham. He fell ill during the year and on his return in May 1903 his condition worsened.

Later life 
On 3 August 1903, Webber died in Brisbane at his residence Bishopsbourne. He was buried on Tuesday 4 August 1903 in Toowong Cemetery.

References
 
George P. Shaw, 'Webber, William Thomas Thornhill (1837–1903)', Australian Dictionary of Biography, Volume 12, MUP, 1990, p. 429.
 Sources listed by the Australian Dictionary of Biography:
Church of England Diocese of Brisbane, Proceedings of Synod, 1884-1904 and Year Book, 1890-1904; K. Rayner, The History of the Church of England in Queensland (PhD thesis, University of Queensland, 1962); Webber papers (Church of England Diocesan Archives, Brisbane).

1837 births
1903 deaths
People educated at Tonbridge School
People educated at Norwich School
Alumni of Pembroke College, Oxford
Anglican bishops of Brisbane
Members of the London School Board